Sriballav Panigrahi (2 September 1940 – 9 July 2015) was an Indian politician, a leader of the Indian National Congress party in Odisha and was a member of the All India Congress Committee (AICC). He was elected to the Parliament of India from the Deogarh Lok Sabha constituency, three times, 1984, 1991 and 1996.

Biography
Born into a freedom fighter's family at Bargaon, Sambalpur district, Odisha in 1940, he has held various positions in the party as well in the government. He was thrice elected as a Member of Parliament (Lok Sabha) from the Deogarh Parliamentary Constituency (1984, 1991 & 1996) and was also a Member of the Odisha Legislative Assembly for two terms (1971 & 1974). He was a Cabinet Minister in Odisha from 1973 to 1977 (widely believed to be the youngest Cabinet Minister in India at that time). He is regarded as an honest and straightforward politician. He is also known as 'Mr. Clean' in Odisha political circles for having a squeaky clean reputation. Good oratory skills, austere lifestyle and simple demeanour are seen as hallmarks of his personality. In his hometown, he is widely believed to be the person who was responsible for the establishment of Mahanadi Coalfields Limited (MCL) at Sambalpur.  He is also credited with getting the Railway Division for Sambalpur City.

Political career

Congress Party 
He joined the party during his student days and rose quickly within its ranks, was made the District Congress Committee (DCC) President of Sambalpur District in 1967 while he was just 27 years old. This made him the youngest DCC president in the country. He has been in the party all through and has held several positions within the party. He was a member of the All India Congress Committee (AICC).

Organisational responsibilities 
 General Secretary, Odisha Pradesh Congress Committee (OPCC) (1969-74 & 1977-80)
 Vice President, Odisha Pradesh Congress Committee (1992–95)	
 AICC observer for elections:
 Assam-1985, 2002
 Tamil Nadu-1988
 Madhya Pradesh-1994
 Chhatishgarh-1999 & 2004	
 Membership of AICC Committees:
 Member of AICC Committee to probe into the causes and circumstances of the debacle of the party in Punjab Assembly Elections (1997)
 Member of the AICC team to enquire into the communal disturbances in Rae Barielly (U.P.) in 1994
 Member of the AICC team to enquire into the communal disturbances in Ajmer (Rajasthan) in 1996
 Pradesh Returning Officer (PRO)-cum-Chairman State Election Authority for organizational election in Gujarat in 2006-07
 Pradesh Returning Officer (PRO)-cum-Chairman State Election Authority for organizational election in Gujarat in 2010

Odisha Legislative Assembly 
He was elected to the Odisha Legislative Assembly twice (In 1971 and 1973) from Sambalpur Assembly Constituency. He was made Cabinet Minister in 1973 by the then Chief Minister, Mrs. Nandini Satpathy at the age of 33 years. He was widely regarded to be the youngest Cabinet Minister in India at that point of time. He handled portfolios of Revenue, Irrigation & Power, Law, Education, Parliamentary Affairs, Food & Civil Supplies and Commerce.

Lok Sabha 
He was rated as an excellent Parliamentarian and was given the responsibility by the party to speak on important debates. Because of his active participation in the house proceedings, he was made the Chairman of the Parliamentary Standing Committee on Petroleum and Chemicals (1993 onwards) and also made member of various important committees. He has held several positions while being in the Parliament like:
 Chairman, Parliamentary Standing Committee on Petroleum & Chemicals (1993–1996)
 Member of Congress Parliamentary Party (CPP) Executive Committee (1991–1997)
 Member of the high-profile JPC (Joint Parliamentary Committee) to probe the Securities Scam in 1992
 Member of the JPC on broadcasting (1996)
 Member of Estimates Committee, Consultative Committee (Ministry of Coal)
 Chairman, Energy Ministry Probe Committee
 Chairman, INTUC (Indian National Trade Union Congress) Parliamentary Forum (1993–97)

Trade union activities 
 Member, INTUC (Indian National Trade Union Congress) National Working Committee
 President, Odisha Colliery Mazdoor Sangh (INTUC) Mahanadi Coalfields Limited (MCL) Sambalpur, Odisha. This union is among the largest trade unions in Odisha with a membership of over 10,000 employees (among the 5 largest trade unions in Odisha)
 Vice President of Indian National Mineworkers Federation
 Member Trust Board of Gandhi Labour Foundation Puri
 Member, National Safety Council

Other activities and positions held 
Has been associated with several Educational, Social, Cultural and Spiritual Organizations. Also held the below responsibilities:
 President, New Life Education Trust for Promotion of Sri Aurobindo Integral Education in Odisha (A managing body of over 540 schools in Odisha)
 President, Sri. Aurobindo Karma Mandir, Sambalpur.
 National Vice President, All India Peace and Solidarity Organization (AIPSO)
 National Vice President, Indian Society for Cultural Co-operation and Friendship (ISCUF)
 General Secretary, All India Yoga Conference
 Chairman, State Gandhiji's Satyagraha Celebration Committee
 Member of the Senate and Syndicate, Sambalpur University 1969–72.
 Editor, Oriya Daily ‘The Hirakhand’ (1982–84)

Personal
He was married to Sunanda Panigrahi (A retired Reader in English, Government of Odisha) and had two sons. He died in 2015, aged 74.

References

External links
 Official page at Lok Sabha
 http://www.nsc.org.in/LINKS/Board_Members.htm
 http://plasim.blogspot.com/2006/08/sri-aurobindo-institute-of-integral.html
 http://www.pragativadi.com/310710/business_news.htm

1940 births
2015 deaths
India MPs 1984–1989
India MPs 1991–1996
India MPs 1996–1997
Members of the Odisha Legislative Assembly
Indian National Congress politicians
People from Sambalpur district
Lok Sabha members from Odisha
People from Debagarh district
Sambalpur University alumni